was a Japanese voice actor. He was from Yokohama, Japan.

Kiyoshi was part of 81 Produce.



Notable roles

TV drama
Tokugawa Ieyasu (1983) (Torii Mototada)
Dokuganryū Masamune (1987) (Sirakawa Yoshichika)

Anime television
3000 Leagues in Search of Mother (Pietro Rossi)
Cyborg 009 (Van Allen (ep. 35))
D.Gray-man (Kevin Yeegar)
Detective Conan (Kanaya (ep. 57, 58))
Heisei Tensai Bakabon (various roles)
Kimba the White Lion (Bou)
King Fang (Youichiro)
Lupin III Part II (Bordeaux police chief (ep. 12))
O-bake no... Holly (Moppusu)
Onegai! Samia Don (Samiadon)
Science Ninja Team Gatchaman (various roles)
Paranoia Agent (Fuyubachi)
Salaryman Kintarō (Tomokazu Morinosuke)
Science Ninja Team Gatchaman F (various roles)
Silent Möbius (Grospoliner)
Tengen Toppa Gurren Lagann (Guame the Immoveable)
Tottoko Hamtaro (Chairman Inatori)
Trigun (Max)
 Uchuusen Sagittarius (various roles)
 Zero Tester (Dr. Tachibana)

OVAs
Bubblegum Crisis (Quincy)
Cybernetics Guardian (Folkes)
Genesis Survivor Gaiarth (Zoniac (ep. 2))
Master Keaton (Colonel Fox (ep. 38–39))
Spirit Warrior (Father Takahata (ep. 3))
 Ten Little Gall Force: Super Deformed Double Feature (Quincy)
Ys (Dares)
Legend of the Galactic Heroes Gaiden (1998) ((Baron von Keyserling (ep. 9–12)))

Films
Alakazam the Great (Kinkaku)
Arabian Nights: Sinbad's Adventures (Great King Torfa)
Cyborg 009 (Biggle)
Doraemon: Nobita and the Animal Planet (Delegration leader)
Silent Möbius (Grospoliner)
Slayers Great (Lord Haizen)
Tezuka Osamu Story: I am Son-Goku (Wan-Raimin)
Wanpaku Ouji no Orochi Taiji (various roles)

Drama CDs
Banana Fish ("Papa" Dino Golzine)

Video games
The Bouncer (Wong Leung)

Dubbing

Live-action
Jim Broadbent
Bullets over Broadway (Warner Purcell)
Bridget Jones's Diary (Mr. Colin Jones)
Bridget Jones: The Edge of Reason (Mr. Colin Jones)
Bridget Jones's Baby (Mr. Colin Jones)
Diff'rent Strokes (Phillip Drummond)
Dr. Dolittle (Mr. Calloway (Peter Boyle))
The Great Escape (Col von Luger)
Indiana Jones and the Temple of Doom (Captain Philip Blumburtt (Philip Stone))
Jack Reacher (Martin Cash (Robert Duvall))
The Rock (Chief Justice (Philip Baker Hall))
Wild Wild West (2002 NTV edition) (US Marshal Coleman (M. Emmet Walsh))

Animation
The Aristocats (Edgar)
The Perils of Penelope Pitstop (Silverster Sneakly AKA The Hooded Claw)
Robin Hood ("Prince" John)
The Swan Princess series (Puffin)
Zoom the White Dolphin (Mickaël)

References

 
81 Produce profile

External links 
 

1929 births
2019 deaths
81 Produce voice actors
Japanese male voice actors
Male voice actors from Yokohama
20th-century Japanese male actors
21st-century Japanese male actors